Scott Smith is an American politician and a Republican member of the Wyoming House of Representatives representing the 5th district since January 10, 2023.

Political career

Smith ran against incumbent Republican representative Shelly Duncan in the Republican primary on August 16, 2022, and defeated Duncan with 54% of the vote. He then won the general election on November 8, 2022, defeating independent candidate Todd Peterson with 58% of the vote. In January 2023, Smith voted against legislation that would protect and safeguard Wyoming children from underage marriages.

References

External links
Profile from Ballotpedia

Living people
Republican Party members of the Wyoming House of Representatives
People from Lingle, Wyoming
Spring Arbor University alumni
21st-century American politicians
Year of birth missing (living people)